First United Presbyterian Church may refer to:

in the United States
 First United Presbyterian Church (Long Beach, California); see List of City of Long Beach historic landmarks
 First United Presbyterian Church (Loveland, Colorado)
 First United Presbyterian Church (Sterling, Colorado)
 First United Presbyterian Church (Sault Ste. Marie, Michigan)
 First United Presbyterian Church (Auburn, Nebraska)
 First United Presbyterian Church (Madison, Nebraska)
 First United Presbyterian Church (Athens, Tennessee)